The Golden Reel Award for Outstanding Achievement in Sound Editing – Dialogue and ADR for Episodic Short Form Broadcast Media is an annual award given by the Motion Picture Sound Editors. It honors sound editors whose work has warranted merit in the field of television; in this case, their work in the field of automated dialogue replacement, or ADR in short form broadcast media. The "short form" of the title refers to television episodes that have a runtime of less than one hour, though more than 35 minutes, as those episodes now have their own category. It was first awarded in 1998, for episodes premiering the previous year, under the title Best Sound Editing – Television Episodic – Dialogue & ADR. The term "short form" was added to the category in 2005, though long-form television had had its own category by then. The award has been given with its current title since 2018.

Winners and nominees

1990s
Best Sound Editing – Television Episodic – Dialogue & ADR

2000s

Sound Editing in Television – Dialogue and ADR, Episodic

Best Sound Editing in Television Episodic – Dialogue & ADR

Best Sound Editing in Television Short Form – Dialogue & ADR

Best Sound Editing in Television: Short Form – Dialogue and Automated Dialogue Replacement

Best Sound Editing – Short Form Dialogue and ADR in Television

2010s

Outstanding Achievement in Sound Editing – Dialogue and ADR for Episodic Short Form Broadcast Media

2020s

Programs with multiple awards

4 awards
 Game of Thrones (HBO)

2 awards
 ER (NBC)
 House (Fox)
 Lost (ABC)
 The Newsroom (HBO)
 Six Feet Under (HBO)
|}

Programs with multiple nominations

9 nominations
 ER (NBC)

7 nominations
 Game of Thrones (HBO)

6 nominations
 CSI: Crime Scene Investigation (CBS)
 Lost (ABC)
 The Walking Dead (AMC)

5 nominations
 True Blood (HBO)
 The West Wing (NBC)

4 nominations
 NYPD Blue (ABC)
 Third Watch (NBC)
 Vikings (History)

3 nominations
 CSI: Miami (CBS)
 CSI: NY (CBS)
 Homeland (Showtime)
 Law & Order (NBC)
 Mad Men (AMC)
 The Newsroom (HBO)
 Six Feet Under (HBO)
 The X-Files (Fox)

2 nominations
 24 (Fox)
 Agents of S.H.I.E.L.D. (ABC)
 Alias (ABC)
 American Dreams (NBC)
 American Horror Story (FX)
 Buffy the Vampire Slayer (The WB)
 The District (CBS)
 Fringe (Fox)
 The Handmaid's Tale (Hulu)
 House (Fox)
 Law & Order: Special Victims Unit (NBC)
 The Mandalorian (Disney+)
 Penny Dreadful (Showtime)
 The Practice (ABC)
 Roar (Fox)
 Sex and the City (HBO)
 Smallville (The CW)
 The Tudors (Showtime)
 Xena: Warrior Princess (Syndicated)

External links
Official MPSE website

References

Awards established in 1997
Golden Reel Awards (Motion Picture Sound Editors)